Dawid Ryndak (born 12 March 1989) is a Polish professional footballer who plays as a right midfielder for Zagłębie Sosnowiec.

References

Polish footballers
1989 births
Living people
Association football midfielders
Zagłębie Sosnowiec players
Ząbkovia Ząbki players
Legionovia Legionowo players
Puszcza Niepołomice players
Ekstraklasa players
I liga players
II liga players